Ridgway Apartments, also known as North Ridgeway Apartments & South Ridgeway Apartments, are two historic apartment buildings located at Joplin, Jasper County, Missouri.  They were built in 1918, and are three-story, rectangular brick buildings.  Each measures approximately 42 feet by 125 feet and feature centrally placed entrances embellished with a prominent pediment surround and stepped parapets that crown the main facade. 

It was listed on the National Register of Historic Places in 2006. It is located in the Murphysburg Historic District.

References

Individually listed contributing properties to historic districts on the National Register in Missouri
Residential buildings on the National Register of Historic Places in Missouri
Residential buildings completed in 1918
Buildings and structures in Joplin, Missouri
National Register of Historic Places in Jasper County, Missouri